SR 91 may refer to:

 Aurora (aircraft)
 State Road 91 or State Route 91, in the list of highways numbered 91
 SR-91, used to make sunglasses